The Pennsylvania Bar Association (PBA) is a voluntary bar association of lawyers and law students in Pennsylvania, United States. The association offers membership benefits, including publications, practice support, networking, and continuing education.

Membership requirements

Membership into the Pennsylvania Bar Association is open to any lawyer who is in good standing and licensed by the bar of Pennsylvania. Associate membership is open to attorneys in good standing licensed in other states but not licensed in Pennsylvania. The association also offers free law student memberships for current law students.

Organization
The association has several executive officers, including president, president-elect and vice president.  It was incorporated on July 9, 1895

Pennsylvania Bar Foundation

The Pennsylvania Bar Foundation is the 501(c)(3) charitable affiliate of the Pennsylvania Bar Association. It was incorporated in 1984 with the purpose of assisting the association to be involved with public service. The foundation is managed by 23 voting members of its board of directors. Financial support of the foundation comes from voluntary contributions.

Young Lawyers Division
The Young Lawyers Division of the Pennsylvania Bar Association is for members who are age 40 or younger or who have been practicing law for less than five years. Membership is free and automatic for members who meet the age and practice criteria.

Gallery

References

External links
Pennsylvania Bar Association Website

Pennsylvania law
American state bar associations
1895 establishments in Pennsylvania
Organizations established in 1895